Jade Fever is a Canadian documentary television series from Discovery Channel Canada, produced by Omnifilm Entertainment. The series follows a long-standing jade mining family as they explored and placer-mined nephrite jade in the Dease Lake area of Northern British Columbia while also running a small motel and souvenir business in Jade City. Narrated by Martin Strong, the series debuted in April 2015 and focused on the challenges of a small, family-run jade operation. Jade Fever was nominated for a 2016 Canadian Screen Award in the "Best Factual Program or Series" category. As of 2021, there have been 7 seasons. The series premiered on The Weather Channel in the US on June 5, 2021. It can also be watched in Germany, France, Sweden, Australia, Russia and in many other territories. In April 2021, Jade Fever became available to stream on CTV.ca. The series was cancelled in July 2021. Prior to its cancellation, Tahltan First Nation claimed the series was being filmed in a mine in Tahltan territory without approval from the nation. However, permits from the Ministry of Energy and Mines had been obtained. In July 2021, Bell Media did not respond to questions of whether the series was pulled off-air owing to pressure from the Tahltan First Nation.

Summary
Jade City is a remote highway stop in northern British Columbia with a community of 25 run by Claudia Bunce and her husband Robin. They mine a huge jade claim and they employ most of the people in town. If they strike it rich everyone wins; if they fail, a whole town falls flat on its face.

Cast

Claudia Bunce  The matriarch of the Bunce jade mining family and the mine boss bookkeeper (season 1–7).
Robin Bunce  The patriarch of the Bunce jade mining family and heavy truck/construction equipment operator (season 1–7).
Josh Bunce  Claudia and Robin's youngest son, a mine hand, heavy truck/construction equipment operator (season 1–7), and camp medic (season 3).
Justin Bunce  Claudia and Robin's eldest son, a mine hand, prospector, heavy truck/construction equipment operator (season 2; season 7), and jade tabletop maker (season 3).

Steve Simonovic  Claudia Bunce's father, a pioneer Cassiar Country jade miner, and founder of Jade City (season 1–2 and season 5–7)
Guy Martial  Mine hand, heavy truck/construction equipment operator (season 1–5)
Robin, a.k.a. "R-2"  Mine hand, heavy truck/construction equipment operator (season 1–7), and alternate camp medic (season 3).
Alan Qiao  First Chinese investor (season 1–2).
Gary Wentworth  Mine hand, heavy truck/construction equipment operator, and friend of Guy (season 3–7).
"Scrappy" Larry  Local scrap metal/used heavy truck/used construction equipment dealer, heavy truck/construction equipment mechanic, heavy truck/construction equipment operator, and Bunce family friend (season 2–3; season 5–7).
Susan  Scrappy Larry's common-law wife (season 5, episode 3–6).
Alex  Bunce company employee residing in Jade City (season 2; season 3).
Joe, a.k.a. "Jo-Jo"  Bunce company employee residing in Jade City (season 2–3; season 5).
Karim Kaouar  Professional pastry chef, Two Mile mine camp cook (season 5–6).
Peter Niu  NEK Mining Inc. company executive (season 3).
William  Beijing-based representative of NEK Mining (season 3).
Christina  Vancouver-based representative of NEK Mining (season 3).
Chris  Geologist, mine hand, and Justin's friend (season 3).
Henry  Jade miner on a neighbouring claim and Bunce family friend (season 3).
Mike Mee  Engineer, mine hand, venture capital fundraiser, and Justin's friend (season 2–3).:

List of episodes

Season 1

Season 2

Season 3

Season 4

Season 5

Season 6

Season 7

Impact on industry
In season 3, the Bunce's hard rock mining operation at the Dynasty claim started to successfully quarry jade – a first in jade mining; which usually rips jade lenses out of rock with heavy equipment instead of quarrying it out like marble.

Controversy 
In 2020 Tahltan First Nation requested the show's mining crew cease operations of their mine as they had not consulted with or sought approvals from Tahltan First Nation to mine within their territory. Tahltan reached out to Bell Media and Omnifilm who develop the program to cease filming. In May 2021, Bell Media claimed they were unaware of the requests from Tahltan First Nation, but claimed they would investigate into the matter. In May 2021, after request from Tahltan Central Government, the Province of British Columbia put an order to not issue jade mining permits in the region for 2 years.

See also
Gemstone mining TV shows
 Ice Cold Gold, a cancelled reality TV series featuring gemstone prospecting in Greenland
 Gold Rush (season 4, in Guyana, with placer diamond mining)
 Outback Opal Hunters, a reality TV series featuring opal mining in Australia
Resource extraction TV shows in Canada
 Yukon Gold, a cancelled reality TV series featuring placer gold mining in northern BC (seasons 1 & 4) and Yukon

References

External links
 Discover Channel Canada, Jade Fever (official website)
 

Discovery Channel (Canada) original programming
Television shows set in British Columbia
2015 Canadian television series debuts
2021 Canadian television series endings
2010s Canadian reality television series
Mining in British Columbia
Jade